East Kew was a railway station on the Outer Circle railway line, located in the suburb of Kew, Melbourne, Victoria, Australia. The station opened with the line on 24 March 1891, and closed with the line on 12 April 1893. It was located on the west side of Normanby Road, and was the site of a crossing loop with a platform on each track. A goods siding was also provided at the Riversdale end.

The station was reopened on 11 February 1925, for goods traffic only, and was the terminus of the reopened section of the Outer Circle line from Deepdene railway station. Three loop sidings were provided, along with a headshunt, and there was a dead end extension at the Riversdale end. The headshunt, which crossed Normanby Road, was abolished in about 1935 to eliminate the level crossing, and the sidings became dead-end. Goods services were withdrawn on 6 September 1943, and the line back to Riversdale closed.

References
 

Railway stations in Australia opened in 1891
Railway stations closed in 1943
Disused railway stations in Melbourne